Judith Eglington (born 1945) is a Canadian photographer and filmmaker.

Eglington attended the  Ecole des Beaux Arts in Montreal, receiving a diploma in 1961. 

Her work is included in the collections of the National Gallery of Canada and the Center for Creative Photography in Tucson, Arizona.

References

21st-century Canadian photographers
20th-century Canadian photographers
1945 births
Living people